Fully Exposed was the third studio album by soul musician, songwriter, and record producer Willie Hutch. It was released in 1973 on Motown Records, the same year as Hutch's soundtrack to The Mack.

Track listing
All tracks composed by Willie Hutch; except where indicated
 "I Wanna Be Where You Are" (Arthur Ross, Leon Ware) - 4:35
 "Can't Get Ready for Losing You" (Richard Hutch, Willie Hutch) - 5:51
 "I Just Wanted to Make Her Happy" - 4:25
 "California My Way" - 7:30
 "Tell Me Why Has Our Love Turned Cold" - 4:08
 "Sunshine Lady" - 3:56
 "I'll Be There" (Berry Gordy, Bob West, Hal Davis, Willie Hutch) - 5:04
 "If You Ain't Got No Money (You Can't Get No Honey)" - 5:04
 "Ain't Nothing Like Togetherness" - 4:56

Personnel
Willie Hutch - guitar, vocals, arrangements
Carolyn Willis, Dennis Alpert, Julia Tillman Waters, Maxine Willard Waters, Milton Hayes, Oren Waters, Richard Hutch - backing vocals
Lawrence "Slim" Dickens - bass guitar
King Errisson, Sam Clayton - congas
Fred White - drums
Tommy Myles - flute, saxophone 
Tim Lawson - guitar
Alan Estes, Gene Estes - percussion
Joe Sample - piano
Technical
Rick Heenan - engineer
Eddy Theodorou - direction, management
Jim Britt - photography

References

1973 albums
Motown albums